was a Japanese daimyō of the Koji era of the Muromachi period.

References 

Daimyo
1557 births
1610 deaths